Mano Po III: My Love is a 2004 Filipino romantic drama film directed by Joel Lamangan and the third installment of the Mano Po film series, following the success of Mano Po and Mano Po 2: My Home. Produced by Regal Entertainment and MAQ Productions, Mano Po III stars Vilma Santos in the leading role.

Synopsis
Anti-crime crusader Lilia Chiong Yang seems to have everything a woman could want and need: a husband, Paul, who pampers her; children whom any parent would be proud of; and the respect and admiration of the most powerful people in the country. But just as Lilia prepares for her 25th wedding anniversary celebration, a chance encounter in Thailand with her first love Michael throws Lilia's life into chaos. So begins the resumption of a relationship that threatens to unravel the delicate threads connecting Lilia to the other people in her life.

In a flashback, Lilia, Paul and Michael are colleagues during the student movement of the early 1970s), with Paul and Michael comforting Lilia when she runs away from her father, Melencio after an argument and learning that she was adopted and encouraging her to go home. The declaration of Martial Law forces them to go low, with Michael going into hiding without realizing that he had impregnated Lilia. Paul, who also had feelings for Lilia, took advantage of the situation by being there for her throughout her struggles and by blocking Michael's letters without their knowledge. 

In the present, the discovery of this revelation and the resumption of Michael and Lilia's relationship causes scandal in the community, tensions between Lilia and her family and a heated argument with Paul, but does not prevent the latter from letting their eldest child Stephen, who is actually Michael's lovechild, from reconnecting with his biological father. Michael, who is frustrated after over the unfairness of their circumstances, calls on Lilia to elope together, but is reluctant to do so. Paul, distraught at Lilia's predicament, apologizes for his treatment of her, but is afterwards shot in an ambush by people Lilia had crossed in her advocacy. Arriving at Paul's deathbed, Michael thanks him for taking care of Lilia while Paul, on his dying breath, entrusts Lilia to Michael's care. Lilia, who is only comforted by her father, is initially shunned by her children and by Paul's family for his death but is later reconciled with them. Michael tries to resume their romance with Lilia, but the latter refuses, reminding him how he encouraged her to go back to her family and that her decision to go with Paul the night they were supposed to elope meant that Michael was not the one killed in the ambush. After telling Michael that she will still be there as a friend, they tearfully embrace and part ways.

Cast
 Vilma Santos as Lilia Chiong-Yang
 Christopher de Leon as Michael Lim
 Jay Manalo as Paul Yang
 Patrick Garcia as Stephen Yang
 Angelica Panganiban as young Lilia Chiong
 Carlo Aquino as young Michael Lim 
 John Prats as young Paul Yang 
 Angel Locsin as Eliza Yang
 Sheryl Cruz as Bernadette Yang
 Karylle as Judith Yang
 Dennis Trillo as Sigmond Lee
 Jean Garcia as Freida Lee 
 Eddie Garcia as Melencio Chiong
 Boots Anson-Roa as Maria Yang
 Jim Pebanco as Nememcio
 Mark Leviste as Paul Yang's executive assistant
 Tim Yap as Chinese opera director

Soundtrack 
The song's theme song is "Pagbigyan ang Puso" performed by Karylle and Jerome John Hughes (version of Tim Hwang's Saranghamnida (released in 2003 from his debut album "First Tim"). The song was composed by former Neocolours frontman Ito Rapadas. Its music video was shown upon the closing credits of the movie.

Awards

See also
Mano Po (Filipino film series)
Mano Po
Mano Po 2
Ako Legal Wife
Mano Po 5: Gua Ai Di
Bahay Kubo: A Pinoy Mano Po!
Mano Po 6: A Mother's Love
Mano Po 7: Tsinoy

References

External links 
 

2004 films
Filipino-language films
2004 romantic drama films
Philippine romantic drama films
Regal Entertainment films
Films directed by Joel Lamangan